The Odebrecht–Car Wash leniency agreement, also known in Brazil as the "end of the world plea deal", was the leniency agreement signed between Odebrecht S.A. and the Public Prosecutor's Office (PGR) in December 2016, as part of Operation Car Wash. The agreement provided for the deposition of 78 of the contractor's executives, including the former president Marcelo Odebrecht, and his father, which generated 83 investigations at the Supreme Federal Court (STF).

In March 2017, Attorney General Rodrigo Janot asked the Supreme Tribunal to withdraw the secrecy of the depositions. The following month, on 11 April, STF Minister Edson Fachin accepted the request of the A-G and withdrew the secrecy of investigations. On 12 April, federal judge Sérgio Moro followed the same line as the Supreme Tribunal and withdrew the secrecy of denunciations involving people without  status from the jurisdiction of judges of first instance. Moro said in his order, "The judiciary should not be the guardian of shadowy secrets. Moreover, publicity prevents unlawful, regrettable leaks, which are difficult to control".

According to the lead prosecutor of Operation Car Wash, Deltan Dallagnol, the leniency agreement provided the "greatest refund in world history". Odebrecht and Braskem pleaded guilty and would pay fines of 3.5 billion dollars, the equivalent of 12 billion reals, 80 per cent of which would go to Brazil.

In 2018, the STF took from Lava Jato the so-called End of the World denunciation in which 415 politicians from 26 parties were mentioned, but merely one was convicted. It generated 270 investigations, but only five of them became criminal proceedings.

The  resulted in several , especially in the Americas.

See also 

 Brazilian Anti-Corruption Act
 Chamber of Deputies
 Condução coercitiva
 Constitution of Brazil
 Corruption in Brazil
 Crime in Brazil
 Economy of Brazil
 Federal government of Brazil
 Federal Police of Brazil
 Impeachment of Dilma Rousseff
 Impeachment proposals against Michel Temer
 Industry in Brazil
 Judiciary of Brazil
 Law enforcement in Brazil
 Law of Brazil
 Operation Car Wash
 Penal Code of Brazil
 Politics of Brazil
 President of Brazil
 Public Prosecutor's Office (Brazil)
 States of Brazil
 Timeline of Brazilian history

References 
Notes

Citations

External links 

 Constituição Da República Federativa Do Brasil De 1988 
 Constitution of the Federative Republic of Brazil  pdf; 432 pages
 Official Senate legislation search engine for Brazilian law 
 Unofficial translations of Brazilian law into English

Government of Brazil
2016 in Brazil
Political corruption
Political scandals in Brazil
Odebrecht